Laura Spinney (born August 1971) is a British science journalist, novelist, and non-fiction writer whose 2017 book Pale Rider is an account of the 1918 influenza pandemic.

Education 
Spinney graduated with a Bachelor of Science degree in Natural Sciences from Durham University in 1993.

Career
Spinney has written for Nature, National Geographic, The Economist, New Scientist, and The Guardian. She is the author of two novels, The Doctor and The Quick, and a collection of oral history from a central European city entitled Rue Centrale.

In 2017 she published Pale Rider, an account of the 1918 flu pandemic, published by Jonathan Cape who acquired the global rights in an auction in 2015.
Spinney indicates that the global pandemic was the biggest disaster of the 20th century, exceeding the death tolls of both World War I (17 million) and World War II (60 million dead). Its full scope has only been recognised in the 21st century as researchers have examined old records, determining that 1 in 3 people became ill and between 1 in 10 and 1 in 5 died. At the time illiteracy was common, germ theory relatively new, antibiotics had not been discovered, and long-distance communication was often limited.

The first clearly identified and documented case was Albert Gitchell, a U.S. Army cook who reported in sick at Camp Funston in Kansas on 4 March 1918. Three distinct waves of disease outbreak occurred worldwide: in spring 1918, in late summer and autumn, and from later winter 1918 to early 1919. Between the first and second waves, the virus mutated and became more deadly in humans.  The death toll in countries like China and India was particularly poorly documented. Spinney vividly describes conditions from all over the globe, from Rio de Janeiro to Russia.

Spinney's English translation of Swiss writer Charles-Ferdinand Ramuz's novel Derborence was published in 2018. In 2019 she spent two months as a journalist-in-residence at the Max Planck Institute for the History of Science in Berlin, Germany.

Books 
Spinney's published books and novels include:
 The Doctor
 The Quick
 Rue Centrale
 Pale Rider: The Spanish Flu of 1918 and How it Changed the World
 Derborence: Where the devils came down

Articles 
Spinney's published articles include:
 
 H.M. The Economist, 2008.
 
 How Facebook, fake news and friends are warping your memory

Personal life
Spinney lives in Paris, France.

References 

1971 births
British science journalists
Living people
British emigrants to France
British women novelists
20th-century British women writers
20th-century British journalists
21st-century British women writers
21st-century British writers
21st-century British journalists
Alumni of St Mary's College, Durham